Pyropteron is a genus of moths in the family Sesiidae.

Species

Subgenus Pyropteron Newman, 1832
Pyropteron biedermanni Le Cerf, 1925
Pyropteron ceriaeforme (Lucas, 1849)
Pyropteron chrysidiforme (Esper, 1782)
Pyropteron chrysidiforme chrysidiforme (Esper, 1782)
Pyropteron chrysidiforme siculum Le Cerf, 1922
Pyropteron doryliforme (Ochsenheimer, 1808)
Pyropteron doryliforme doryliforme (Ochsenheimer, 1808)
Pyropteron doryliforme icteropus (Zeller, 1847)
Pyropteron minianiforme (Freyer, 1843)
Pyropteron minianiforme minianiforme (Freyer, 1843)
Pyropteron minianiforme destitutum (Staudinger, 1894)
Pyropteron minianiforme aphrodite Bartsch, 2004

Subgenus Synansphecia Capuse, 1973
Pyropteron hispanicum (Kallies, 1999:92)
Pyropteron maroccanum (Kallies, 1999)
Pyropteron meriaeforme (Boisduval, 1840)
Pyropteron meriaeforme meriaeforme (Boisduval, 1840)
Pyropteron meriaeforme venetense (de Joannis, 1908)
Pyropteron triannuliforme (Freyer, 1842)
Pyropteron atlantis (Schwingenschuss, 1935)
Pyropteron borreyi (Le Cerf, 1922)
Pyropteron koschwitzi (Špatenka, 1992)
Pyropteron muscaeforme (Esper, 1783)
Pyropteron muscaeforme muscaeforme (Esper, 1783)
Pyropteron muscaeforme occidentale (de Joannis, 1908)
Pyropteron muscaeforme lusohispanicum Lastuvka & Lastuvka, 2007
Pyropteron atypicum Kallies & Špatenka, 2003
Pyropteron cirgisum (Bartel, 1912)
Pyropteron koshantschikovi (Püngeler, 1914)
Pyropteron umbriferum (Staudinger, 1871)
Pyropteron affine (Staudinger, 1856)
Pyropteron affine affine (Staudinger, 1856)
Pyropteron affine erodiiphagum (Dumont, 1922)
Pyropteron aistleitneri (Špatenka, 1992)
Pyropteron kautzi (Reisser, 1930)
Pyropteron leucomelaena (Zeller, 1847)
Pyropteron hera (Špatenka, 1997)
Pyropteron mannii (Lederer, 1853)

References

Sesiidae